Bhalariya is a census town in Udaipur district  in the state of Rajasthan, India.

Demographics
 India census, Bhalariya had a population of 6530. Males constitute 53% of the population and females 47%. Bhalariya has an average literacy rate of 83%, higher than the national average of 59.5%; with 55% of the males and 45% of the females literate. 10% of the population is under 6 years of age.

References

Cities and towns in Udaipur district